Toomas Triisa (born 12 November 1982) is an Estonian rally driver. Triisa won 2017 Dakar Rally Malle Moto class. He is the Estonian champion in various rally classes such as motocross.

Dakar results

Achievements

 1999 - Estonia Motocross Championship: 1st place overall.
 1999 - Estonian Stadium Motocross Championship: 1st place overall.
 2004 - Estonian Ice Racing Championship: 1st place in Open class.
 2005 - Gotland Grand National Enduro: 1st place in class 4.
 2006 - Gotland Grand National Enduro: 2nd place in class 4.
 2007 - Estonian Ice Racing Championship: 1st place in MX1 class.
 2014 - Dakar Rally: 55th place in Bikes class.
 2017 - Dakar Rally: 30th place in Bikes class and 1st place in Malle Moto class.
 2022 - Rally Breslau: 15th place 
 2022 - Rallye du Maroc: 9th place
 2023 - Dakar Rally: 46th place overall and 11th place in T4 class.

References

External links
 Võimas: Toomas Triisa tuli raskes klassis Dakari ralli võitjaks

Living people
1982 births
Estonian rally drivers
Dakar Rally drivers
Dakar Rally motorcyclists
Sportspeople from Tallinn